Książnice Wielkie  is a village in the administrative district of Gmina Koszyce, within Proszowice County, Lesser Poland Voivodeship, in southern Poland.

The village has a population of 520.

References

External links

Villages in Proszowice County